The APF Microcomputer System is a second generation 8-bit cartridge-based home video game console released in October 1978 by APF Electronics Inc. with six cartridges. The console is often referred to M-1000 or MP-1000, which are the two model numbers of the console. The APF-MP1000 comes built-in with the game Rocket Patrol. The APF-MP1000 is a part of the APF Imagination Machine. The APF-MP1000 and the APF Imagination Machine were developed in part by the noted engineer Ed Smith.

It is the successor to the APF TV Fun line of first generation consoles.

Technical specifications

 CPU: Motorola 6800 (8 bit) @ 0.895 MHz (3.579 MHz oscillator divided by 4)
 RAM: 1 KB
 Video Display Controller: MC6847
 Palette : 8 colors
 Resolutions: 256×192×4 / 128×192×8
 Power Supply: 7.5 V AC 0.8 A or 12 V DC 0.5 A

Cartridge list

References

Further reading 
 "APF MP-1000 Game Console Programming"
 APF MP-1000 page at Old-Computers.com museum
 Ed Smith And The Imagination Machine: The Untold Story Of A Black Video Game Pioneer (Benj Edwards, FastCompany, 2016)
 Benj Edwards Presents Vintage Computing and Gaming - Adventures in Classic Technology. Blog posts.
 Video Game Console Library
 TheGameConsole.com
 APF-*1000/IM – Guides and FAQs by GameFAQs (Updated: 06/09/2001)
- APF-M1000, APF-MP1000 & Imagination Machine FAQ (Backup copy of above at Console Database)
 APF M1000 Video Game System Review by THE NORTHEAST OHIO VIDEO HUNTER (August 1, 2013)

Home video game consoles
Second-generation video game consoles
Products introduced in 1978
68xx-based computers